Emily Adams is a Reader in Diagnostics for Infectious Disease at Liverpool School of Tropical Medicine. She is diagnostic lead for the Centre for Drugs and Diagnostics developing with industry diagnostics for various diseases. She is also the Director for Epidemics and Neglected Tropical Disease at Global Access Diagnostics (formerly Mologic), a not-for-profit diagnostics company in the UK.

She was World Health Organization TDR (Special Programme on Tropical Diseases Research) consultant in their RDT evaluation for Leishmaniasis program whilst working at the Koninklijk Instituut voor de Tropen.

References

External links

Living people
British women scientists
Year of birth missing (living people)
Academics of the University of Liverpool
Alumni of the University of Bristol
British medical researchers